Gate of Heaven Cemetery, approximately 25 miles (40 km) north of New York City, was established in 1917 at 10 West Stevens Ave. in Hawthorne, Westchester County, New York, as a Roman Catholic burial site. Among its famous residents is baseball player Babe Ruth, whose grave has an epitaph by Cardinal Francis Spellman and is almost always adorned by many baseballs, bats and caps. Adjacent to the Garden Mausoleum is a small train station of the Metro-North Railroad Harlem Division named Mount Pleasant, where four trains stop daily, two northbound and two southbound. Several baseball players are buried here.

Notable interments 
Robert Abplanalp (1922–2003), inventor of the aerosol spray valve
Fred Allen (1894–1956), actor and comedian
 Mario Biaggi (1917-2015), decorated policeman and US Congressman
Spruille Braden (1894–1978), diplomat
Ralph Branca (1926–2016), professional baseball pitcher who gave up the Shot Heard 'Round the World to Bobby Thomson in 1951
Heywood Broun (1888–1939), journalist
Ronald Paul Bucca (1954–2001), New York City Fire Department Marshal killed in the September 11 attacks
Charles A. Buckley (1890–1967), United States Representative from New York
Frances W. "Billie" Cagney, née Vernon (1899–1994), dancer and wife of James Cagney
James Cagney (1899–1986), actor
Charles J. Carroll (1882–1942), lawyer and politician
Emil A. Ciccotelli (1929–1998), Chief of Detectives New York City Police Department
Mary Higgins Clark (1927–2020), novelist 
Bob Considine (1906–1975), author
Mark J. Coyle (1965-2007), political consultant
Angelo "Gyp" DeCarlo (1902–1973), mobster
Philip D'Antoni (1929–2018), film producer
Dudley Digges (1880–1947), stage and film actor
Bella Dodd (1904–1969), activist, teacher and attorney
Dorothy Donnelly (1876–1928), actress, playwright, librettist, producer and director
Jessica Dragonette (1900–1980), singer
James Farley (1888–1976), Postmaster General and advisor to President Franklin D. Roosevelt
Joseph T. Flynn (1894–1935), World War I pilot, New York State Assemblyman, lawyer
Samuel J. Foley (1891–1951), attorney, judge and Bronx County District Attorney
Bill Froats (1930–1998), baseball player
Henry Jacques Gaisman, philanthropist and inventor of the safety razor
Federico García Rodríguez (1859-1945), father of Federico García Lorca
Hector Guimard (1867–1942), French architect and most prominent representative of the Art Nouveau movement in France
Ernest E. L. Hammer, Administrator of the Bronx, Supreme Court Justice of the State of New York, presided over Bruno Hauptman trial for extradition in the Lindbergh baby kidnapping
Frank Hardart (1884–1972), son of founder of Horn & Hardart automat
Julie Haydon (1910–1994), actress
Martin J. Healy (1883–1942), member of the New York State Assembly and New York City Board of Aldermen
Anna Held (1872–1918), actress and singer
Portland Hoffa (1905–1990), actress
Phillips Holmes (1907–1942), actor
Phillips Holmes (1911-1942), Royal Canadian Air Force airman of World War II (lying in a Commonwealth war grave)
Bess Houdini (1876–1943), wife of magician Harry Houdini
Peter Hujar (1934–1987), photographer and artist
G. Murray Hulbert (1881–1950), United States Representative from New York
Ethel D. Jacobs (1910–2001), thoroughbred racehorse owner
Peggy Hopkins Joyce (1893–1957), actress and socialite
Arthur Judson (1881–1975), co-founder of CBS
Owen M. Kiernan (1867–1940), member of the New York State Assembly
Dorothy Kilgallen (1913–1965), journalist and television personality
Richard Kollmar (1910–1971), Broadway producer
T. Vincent Learson (1912–1996), IBM chairman and Ambassador at Large for Law of the Sea Matters
Ernesto Lecuona (1896–1963), composer and songwriter
James J. Lyons (1890–1966), Bronx Borough President from 1934 to 1962
Ann Mara (1929–2015), wife of Wellington Mara
Tim Mara (1887–1959), founder of the NFL New York Giants
Wellington Mara (1916–2005), owner of the NFL New York Giants
Billy Martin (1928–1989), Major League Baseball player/manager
Malachi Martin (1921–1999), Irish Catholic priest and writer
Anne O'Hare McCormick (1880–1954), Pulitzer Prize-winning journalist
Pat McDonald (1871–1954), Olympic champion weight-thrower
Charles B. McLaughlin (1884–1947), attorney, judge and Bronx County District Attorney
John McSherry (1944–1996), Major League Baseball umpire
Sal Mineo (1939–1976), actor
Condé Nast (1873–1942), publisher
George Jean Nathan (1882–1958), drama critic
Elliott Nugent (1896–1980), actor, director and screenwriter 
John P. O'Brien (1873–1951), politician and mayor of New York City 
Richard W. O'Neill (1898–1986), soldier and Medal of Honor recipient in World War I
Fulton Oursler (1893–1952), writer
Lester W. Patterson (1893–1947), Bronx assemblyman and county judge.
Westbrook Pegler (1894–1969), Pulitzer Prize-winning journalist
Justin Pierce (1975-2000), actor and skateboarder
Mike Quill (1905–1966), founder of Transport Workers Union of America
Dan Reeves (1912–1971), former owner of the NFL Los Angeles Rams
Michael Restel (1924-2014), World War II Navy Veteran 
Babe Ruth (1895–1948), Hall of Fame baseball player
Claire Merritt Ruth (1900–1976), wife of baseball great Babe Ruth
Dutch Schultz (1902–1935), mobster
Charles M. Schwab (1862–1939), steel magnate (remains later moved to St. Michael Cemetery in Loretto, Pennsylvania)
Arnold Skaaland (1925–2007), professional wrestler 
Spyros Skouras (1893–1971), former president of 20th Century-Fox
Lisa Steinberg (1981–1987), child murder victim
Daniel V. Sullivan (1886–1966), attorney, judge and Bronx County District Attorney
Henry Waters Taft (1859–1945), lawyer and author, brother of President William Howard Taft
Mike Tiernan (1867- 1918), Professional baseball player New York Giants
James H. Torrens (1874–1952), politician
Jimmy Walker (1881–1946), mayor of New York City
Bill Wendell (1924–1999), television announcer
William B. Widnall (1906–1983), former US Congressman
Malcolm Wilson (1914–2000), Governor of New York for whom the previous Tappan Zee Bridge over the Hudson River was named
Sal Yvars (1924–2008), Major League Baseball catcher

Image gallery

References

External links
Gate of Heaven Cemetery at FindAGrave.com
Gate of Heaven Cemetery at Interment.net

Cemeteries in Westchester County, New York
Roman Catholic cemeteries in New York (state)
Mount Pleasant, New York
1917 establishments in New York (state)